Longalatedes is a genus of moths of the family Noctuidae.

Species
 Longalatedes elymi (Treitschke, 1825)

References
Natural History Museum Lepidoptera genus database
Longalatedes at funet

Xyleninae